Gregory James Edwards is an American minister, clergyman, community activist, progressive politician, and author.

Education 
Edwards earned a Bachelor of Science degree in Urban Ministry from Geneva College. He later received certification in Community Economic Development from the University of Delaware, a Master's of Divinity from Drew University, and a Doctorate in Ministry from the New Brunswick Theological Seminary.

Career

Religion 
Edwards was raised in the African Methodist Episcopal Church (1969–1987), and licensed for ministry in the Baptist Church (1995). In 2002, after graduating from seminary (Drew University Theological School) he founded Resurrected Life Community Church (RLCC). In 2019, the congregation became affiliated with the United Church of Christ. In 2011, he establish the Resurrected Community Development Corporation (RCDC), a 501(c) non-profit organization based in Greater Lehigh Valley.

Community education 
In 2011, Edwards established the Resurrected Life Children's Academy, an early education center licensed by the Pennsylvania Department of Human Services; and in 2014, he established the James Lawson Freedom School in partnership with the Children's Defense Fund. Both programs are initiatives of the Resurrected Community Development Corporation.

Politics 
In 2018, Edwards became one of six Democratic candidates to run for the U.S. House of Representatives Pennsylvania District 7 (formerly District 15) seat, following the retirement of Republican representative Charlie Dent.

On April 29, 2018, Edwards's congressional campaign was endorsed by Vermont Senator and former U.S. presidential candidate Bernie Sanders. He also received endorsements from other political groups.

In a tight Democratic primary race, Edwards followed candidates Susan Wild and John
Morganelli, and ultimately, the U.S. Democratic Congressional Campaign Committee
chose Wild as its candidate.

Although Edwards did not win the race, he made history as the first African-American in the Lehigh Valley to run for a federal office position and was featured in Battleground, the PBS documentary covering Lehigh Valley politics.

Edwards remains active in local, state, and national politics. He was named Chair of the Lehigh County Democratic Black Caucus in 2019, and he was appointed to the Pennsylvania Democratic State Committee in 2020.

Activism 
Edwards is a community organizer and activist for the civil and human rights of all. He is most vocal on issues
concerning the African-American and Latinx communities and low-income families. Throughout his career, Edwards has been known to participate in protests, write open
letters and op-eds to oppose corrupt policies and politicians, and organize groups of
people to take non-violent, direct action.

In 2015, when the Allentown School District ranked 487 out of 500
Pennsylvania districts, Edwards led a rally calling for a sweeping change that would
correct the curriculum, leadership, racism, and sexual harassment issues and claims that
were prevalent at the time.

In 2017, Edwards was arrested along with eight other demonstrators when he protested
outside Pat Meehan's Washington D.C. office to oppose the controversial GOP tax bill. The same year, he was the keynote speaker at a rally held in memory of Trayvon Martin.

In 2020, following the murders of George Floyd, Ahmaud Arbery, and Breonna Taylor,
Edwards organized a protest in Allentown, Pennsylvania, to bring attention to racial
injustices and the need for police reform.

During Donald Trump's presidency, Edwards was also a speaker at the May Day rally at
the Pennsylvania Capitol building. He joined hundreds of immigrants opposing the administration's anti-immigration policies.

Edwards serves as a board member for several local and national non-profit. across the United States.

Awards and honors 
 Man of Vision Award | National Association for the Advancement of Colored People (NAACP)
 Community Development Award | Allentown Human Relations Commission
 Morehouse College - Martin Luther King Jr. College of Pastoral Leadership
 Morehouse College - Martin Luther King Jr. Board of Preachers

References 

Living people
American Christian clergy
American religious leaders
American community activists
African-American people
American writers
Year of birth missing (living people)
Politicians from Lehigh County, Pennsylvania